Aviculopecten is an extinct genus of bivalve mollusc that lived from the Early Devonian to the Late Triassic in Asia, Australia, Europe, North America, and South America.

A fine fossil of the species A. subcardiformis has been found in the 345 million year old Logan Formation of Wooster, Ohio. It is an external mould and the impression left by the valve is so clear that the fine ridges and even the growth lines are visible.

Species 
The following species of Aviculopecten have been described:

 A. altus
 A. appalachianus
 A. arctisulcatus
 A. artiensis
 A. asiaticus
 A. ballingerana
 A. basilicus
 A. batesvillensis
 A. beipeiensis
 A. bellatulus
 A. bertrandi
 A. bouei
 A. caodigouensis
 A. columbianus
 A. coryeanus
 A. coxanus
 A. crebristriatus
 A. crenistriatus
 A. cunctatus
 A. cypticostatus
 A. densistriatus
 A. derajatensis
 A. diemenensis
 A. draschei
 A. eaglensis
 A. expositus
 A. flabellum
 A. frederixi
 A. germanus
 A. giganteus
 A. girtyi
 A. gradicosta
 A. gryphus
 A. guangxiensis
 A. halensis
 A. hardmani
 A. hataii
 A. hayasakai
 A. hemisphaerus
 A. idahoensis
 A. imbricatus
 A. inspeciosus
 A. jabiensis
 A. jennyi
 A. jiaozishanensis
 A. kaibabensis
 A. katwahiensis
 A. keoughensis
 A. khinganensis
 A. kunlunensis
 A. langdaiensis
 A. latrobensis
 A. lobanovae
 A. lopingensis
 A. malayensis
 A. mayesensis
 A. mazonensis
 A. mccoyi
 A. media
 A. minutum
 A. misrikhanensis
 A. moorei
 A. morahensis
 A. morrowensis
 A. multilineatus
 A. multiradiatus
 A. nikolaewi
 A. nitidus
 A. nodocosta
 A. occidentalis
 A. onukii
 A. orientalis
 A. ozarkensis
 A. panxianensis
 A. paradoxus
 A. pealei
 A. peculiaris
 A. pitkinensis
 A. planoradiatus
 A. ponderosus
 A. praecox
 A. prototextorius
 A. pseudoctenostreon
 A. pseudoradiatus
 A. punjabensis
 A. qinghaiensis
 A. regularis
 A. rossiensis
 A. ruklensis
 A. scheremetus
 A. serdobowae
 A. shiroshitai
 A. sicanus
 A. simplicus
 A. spinocostatus
 A. squamiger
 A. squamula
 A. squamula
 A. subparadoxus
 A. subregularis
 A. subtristriatus
 A. sulaensis
 A. sumnerensis
 A. symmetricus
 A. terminalis
 A. tompo
 A. tristriatus
 A. uralicus
 A. verbeeki
 A. waageni
 A. wilczekiformis
 A. winchelli
 A. wynnei
 A. xiaoyuanchongensis
 A. yunnanensis
 A. zhongyingensis

References

Further reading 
 Fossils (Smithsonian Handbooks) by David Ward (Page 98)

Aviculopectinidae
Prehistoric bivalve genera
Paleozoic bivalves
Prehistoric bivalves of North America
Prehistoric invertebrates of Oceania
Prehistoric animals of Asia
Prehistoric animals of Europe
Paleozoic animals of South America
Devonian Colombia
Fossils of Colombia
Floresta Formation
Early Devonian first appearances
Late Devonian animals
Late Triassic extinctions
Paleozoic life of Alberta
Paleozoic life of British Columbia
Paleozoic life of Manitoba
Paleozoic life of Quebec
Fossil taxa described in 1851